Telemedellín is a Colombian local public television channel, which broadcasts for the metropolitan area of Valle de Aburrá and its headquarters are located in the city of Medellín. Telemedellin was officially launched on December 7, 1997, it stands out for being the first local television channel established in Colombia. Its programming is general.

References

External links 
 

Television stations in Colombia
Spanish-language television stations
Television channels and stations established in 1997
Mass media in Medellín
Television networks in Colombia